Antonio Manganelli (8 December 1950 – 20 March 2013) was an Italian police chief, and head of Polizia di Stato from June, 2007, when he replaced Gianni De Gennaro. 

Manganelli was born in Avellino.  He graduated from Naples University and Modena University. Manganelli was close to Giovanni Falcone and Paolo Borsellino during the 1980s in a crime-fighting group. Manganelli's plans helped take down Sicilian Mafiosos, Nitto Santapaola and Giuseppe Lucchese, plus many other Sicilian criminals. In 1995, he was appointed as chief of Palermo and Naples. He served as deputy chief of police in 2000 until he became the official chief of police.  He died in Rome, aged 63.

His family name translates into English as "batons".

References

1950 births
2013 deaths
Italian police officers